The Alliance of Women Directors (AWD) is an American 501c(3) nonprofit organization created to support education and advocacy for women directors in film, television, and new media. The AWD, established in 1997, has over 250 members and is based in Los Angeles.

Programs
The AWD works to support and promote the work, visibility, and professional development for female directors through a variety of programs including screenings, educational events, and industry parties both for their members, and the general public.

The Alliance offers a "TV Shadowing Program" providing opportunities for new directors to learn from experienced directors at work. The AWD is a nominator for the Fox Global Directors Initiative and an allied organization of the Women Filmmakers Initiative.

The AWD helps its members make professional connections. In 2014, Maria Burton was hired as director of A Sort of Homecoming  when the film's producer consulted the AWD to find a suitable candidate. In 2008, Victoria Rose Sampson won a competition for her film, Need for Speed, after being notified about the contest via the Alliance.

Views
According to their press kit, the Alliance believes in "foster[ing] a community of professionals to advance the art, craft and visibility of women directors in the world of film, television and new media" and promotes the idea that it is "vital that stories are told from all perspectives". Eleonore Dailly, co-chair of the AWD, in an interview with Elle magazine, described the group's goals as, "debunk[ing] this myth that there aren't enough female directors. There are highly trained female directors who can handle thrillers and action films just like male directors can handle romantic comedies."

Director Maria Burton was the co-chair of the Alliance for six years. Describing the problem to the LA Daily News, Burton said "through all the years, through all the genres, in front and behind the camera, women are vastly underrepresented." Speaking as an AWD board member, director Jacqui Barcos told The Huffington Post on the lack of women-directed films at Cannes, "complex dramas [...] tend to be difficult to finance in the U.S. If they are complex, the only way to get them financed is to have a big-name director, because then the investors are assured it'll be a masterpiece. And many of the most talented female directors are still relatively unproven, so investors don't want to take a chance." Similarly, Barcos told Variety that it was important to demonstrate that "a woman director can deliver a commercially successful film that is outside the romantic comedy ghetto".

Membership and organization
Currently, AWD membership is over 250, including Eleonore Dailly, Judy Chaikin, director-producer Hilari Scarl, Alexis Krasilovsky, Jen McGowan, Debra Granik, Mimi Leder, Betty Thomas, Bethany Rooney, and Lesli Linka Glatter. To qualify for AWD membership, an applicant must be a woman who has directed a publicly aired feature film, TV episode, TV movie, documentary, commercial, or short film. Members pay annual dues to support the group's work. The AWD is Chairperson, currently Jennifer Warren. It has a six-person board, a smaller advisory board, as well as honorary members and emeritus board members. In March 2019, the AWD board appointed AnnaLea Rawicz Arnold as its first executive director.

Awards

On April 28, 2016, the AWD held its first Alliance of Women Directors Awards ceremony at the Paley Center for Media (Beverly Hills). Television producers Greg Berlanti (Arrow, Supergirl, The Flash) and Ilene Chaiken (Empire) were honored for expanding opportunities for women in directing and other behind the camera roles in the television industry. Producers Chiara Tilesi and Albert Berger of the We Do It Together foundation were also honored, and director Jen McGowan (Kelly & Cal) was awarded the AWD Breakout Award.

See also
 List of female film and television directors

References

External links
 

Women's film organizations
Organizations established in 1997
Women in television
 
 
Professional associations based in the United States
Film organizations in the United States